Nemesis is a 1920 Italian silent film directed by Carmine Gallone and starring Ida De Bonis, Soava Gallone, and Ciro Galvani.

Cast
 Ida De Bonis 
 Soava Gallone as Elisa di Roannez  
 Ciro Galvani as Roudin  
 Carlo Gualandri as Ugo Cordin  
 Lorenzino Pery 
 R. Scomox
 Gino Viotti
 Achille Vitti

References

Bibliography
 Geoffrey Nowell-Smith. The Companion to Italian Cinema. Cassell, 1996.

External links

1920 films
1920s Italian-language films
Films directed by Carmine Gallone
Italian silent feature films
Italian black-and-white films